Aquinas Academy may refer to several schools:

Aquinas Academy (Delaware), Bear, Delaware
Aquinas Academy (New Jersey), Livingston, New Jersey
Aquinas Academy (Pittsburgh, Pennsylvania), Pittsburgh, Pennsylvania
Aquinas Academy (Menomonee Falls, Wisconsin), Menomonee Falls, Wisconsin